Federico Ardila (born 1977) is a Colombian mathematician and DJ who researches combinatorics and specializes in matroid theory. Ardila graduated from MIT with a B.Sc. in Mathematics in 1998 and obtained a Ph.D in 2003 under the supervision of Richard P. Stanley in the same institution. Ardila is currently a professor at the San Francisco State University and additionally holds an adjunct position at the University of Los Andes in Colombia.

Early life and education 
Ardila was born in Bogotá, Colombia. During his childhood Ardila showed great promise in mathematics, scoring the highest amongst his age group in the fourth grade. While attending the college-prep Colegio San Carlos in Bogotá, Ardila represented Colombia in the International Math Olympiad, winning a bronze medal in 1993 and a silver medal in 1994.

Prior to attending MIT, Ardila was already enrolled in another local university. Ardila had never heard of MIT, but a classmate told him that they offered financial aid to everyone, so he applied without knowing how competitive the school was.

In addition to mathematics, Ardila enjoys making music and is a co-founder of the Oakland DJ collective La Pelanga.

Career 
Under his NSF CAREER grant, Ardila has worked to create a larger and more diverse community of members of underrepresented groups within mathematics. Ardila follows certain principles geared towards cultivating diversity within his field of study, which he calls Axioms:

 Axiom 1. Mathematical potential is distributed equally among different groups, irrespective of geographic, demographic, and economic boundaries.
 Axiom 2. Everyone can have joyful, meaningful, and empowering mathematical experiences.
 Axiom 3. Mathematics is a powerful, malleable tool that can be shaped and used differently by various communities to serve their needs.
 Axiom 4. Every student deserves to be treated with dignity and respect.

As part of his SFSU-Colombia combinatorics initiative, Ardila has provided over 200 hours of lecture videos on YouTube with additional resources for free. He is also well known for his appearances in the popular mathematics YouTube video series Numberphile.

Awards 
Ardila has received many awards, among which are:

 Deborah and Franklin Haimo Awards for Distinguished College or University Teaching of Mathematics (2020)
 Simons Foundation Fellowship in Mathematics (2019-2020)
 Premio Nacional de Matemáticas of the Colombian Mathematical Society (2019)
 Fellow of the American Mathematical Society (2018)
 National Science Foundation CAREER Award (2010-2016)

Selected writings
Lagrangian geometry of matroids (2020), with Graham Denham and June Huh
CAT(0) geometry, robots, and society (2019)
Hopf monoids and generalized permutahedra (2017), with Marcelo Aguiar
Todos Cuentan: Cultivating Diversity in Combinatorics (2016)

References

External links
 Professional webpage at San Francisco State University
 Youtube channel
 Twitter
 Mathematics Genealogy Project
 Google Scholar citations
 Numberphile videos: Combinatorics and Higher Dimensions, The Cross Ratio, The Math (and money) of Soccer Stickers
 La Pelanga DJ Collective

21st-century Colombian mathematicians
1979 births
Living people
Academic staff of the University of Los Andes (Colombia)
People from Bogotá
Massachusetts Institute of Technology School of Science alumni
San Francisco State University faculty
Fellows of the American Mathematical Society